Halysidota interlineata is a moth of the family Erebidae first described by Francis Walker in 1855. It is found in Costa Rica, Guatemala, Panama, Belize, Colombia, Venezuela, Suriname, French Guiana, Brazil (Para, Rio de Janeiro, São Paulo, Santa Catarina) and Uruguay.

The larvae feed on Morus species.

References

Moths described in 1855
Halysidota